Hypsioma grisea is a species of beetle in the family Cerambycidae. It was described by Fleutiaux and Sallé in 1889, originally under the genus Hypomia. It is known from Dominica, Guadeloupe, Barbados, and Saint Lucia. It feeds on Mangifera indica, Lonchocarpus punctatus, and Piscidia carthagenensis.

References

grisea
Beetles described in 1889